Very-long-chain 3-oxoacyl-CoA synthase (very-long-chain 3-ketoacyl-CoA synthase, very-long-chain beta-ketoacyl-CoA synthase, condensing enzyme, CUT1 (gene), CERS6 (gene), FAE1 (gene), KCS (gene), ELO (gene)) is an enzyme with systematic name malonyl-CoA:very-long-chain acyl-CoA malonyltransferase (decarboxylating and thioester-hydrolysing). This enzyme catalyses the following chemical reaction

 very-long-chain acyl-CoA + malonyl-CoA  very-long-chain 3-oxoacyl-CoA + CO2 + coenzyme A

This is the first component of the elongase, a microsomal protein complex responsible for extending palmitoyl-CoA and stearoyl-CoA to very-long-chain acyl CoAs. (Very-long-chain in this context refers, for example, to  the C26 fatty acids involved in the synthesis of phospholipids and ceramides.

References

External links 
 

EC 2.3.1